The 1977–78 Sussex County Football League season was the 53rd in the history of Sussex County Football League a football competition in England.

Division One

Division One featured 14 clubs which competed in the division last season, along with two new clubs, promoted from Division Two:
Arundel
Shoreham

League table

Division Two

Division Two featured twelve clubs which competed in the division last season, along with three new clubs:
Albion United, joined from the East Sussex League
Three Bridges, relegated from Division One
Whitehawk, relegated from Division One

League table

References

1977-78
1977–78 in English football leagues